Kvernes Stave Church is a former parish church of the Church of Norway in Averøy Municipality in Møre og Romsdal county, Norway. The old church sits along the Kvernesfjorden in the village of Kvernes, just to the north of the Kvernes Church, the present church for the parish. The white, wooden church was built in a rectangular stave church style sometime during the first half of the 14th century. The church seats about 200 people.

History
The earliest existing historical records of the church date back to the year 1400, but the stave church was probably built during the early-14th century. The church is a single-nave church of the "Møre"-type, characterized by central posts in the external wall and crossbeams. The small nave measures only  and the choir is only , making it one of the smallest stave churches in existence. The church was rebuilt in 1633 and during this renovation the front door was moved from the nave's west side to the south side. Also during this renovation, the old choir was torn down and rebuilt in a timber-framed construction rather than the historic stave construction. In 1648, the tower on the roof was repaired. From 1661 to 1663, a church porch was constructed. A sacristy was built around 1689 as well. In 1776, the church was renovated again. In 1810, the tower on the roof was again repaired.

In 1814, this church served as an election church. Together with more than 300 other parish churches across Norway, it was a polling station for elections to the 1814 Norwegian Constituent Assembly which wrote the Constitution of Norway. This was Norway's first national elections. Each church parish was a constituency that elected people called "electors" who later met together in each county to elect the representatives for the assembly that was to meet in Eidsvoll later that year.

The stave church was closed after the new church was consecrated in 1893. In 1894, the old building was purchased by a group of individuals who donated it as a gift to Society for the Preservation of Ancient Norwegian Monuments. The society has refurbished the building and it is now a museum.

Media gallery

See also
 List of churches in Møre

References

External links

 Kvernes stave church – Stavkirke.org 

Averøy
Churches in Møre og Romsdal
Wooden churches in Norway
Stave churches in Norway
14th-century establishments in Norway
14th-century churches in Norway
Buildings and structures owned by the Society for the Preservation of Ancient Norwegian Monuments
Norwegian election church